Daniel Masur and Jan-Lennard Struff were the defending champions but chose not to defend their title.

Botic van de Zandschulp and Boy Westerhof won the title after defeating Alexandar Lazov and Volodymyr Uzhylovskyi 7–6(8–6), 7–5 in the final.

Seeds

Draw

References
 Main Draw

TEAN International - Doubles
2017 Doubles